The Department of Local Infrastructure Development and Agricultural Roads (DoLIDAR, not to be confused with the Department of Roads), is a department under the Ministry of Federal Affairs and Local Development of Nepal. DoLIDAR is responsible for assisting local governments in the Districts in the engineering aspects of civil engineering construction. It has its branch offices in all the 75 districts.

References

Transport in Nepal
Government departments of Nepal